Uttar Goara is a census town in Kalna I CD Block in Kalna subdivision of Purba Bardhaman district in the Indian state of West Bengal.

Geography

Location
Uttar Goara is located on the agriculturally rich alluvial plains between the Bhagirathi, Ajay and Damodar rivers. Temperatures in this region varies from 17-18 °C in winter to 30-32 °C in summer.

Urbanisation
87.00% of the population of Kalna subdivision live in the rural areas. Only 13.00% of the population live in the urban areas. The map alongside presents some of the notable locations in the subdivision. All places marked in the map are linked in the larger full screen map.

Demographics
As per the 2011 Census of India Uttar Goara had a total population of 7,178, of which 3,717 (52%) were males and 3,461 (48%) were females. Population below 6 years was 658. The total number of literates in Uttar Goara was 5,257 (80.63% of the population over 6 years).

 India census, Uttar Goara had a population of 6,972. Males constitute 51% of the population and females 49%. Uttar Goara has an average literacy rate of 63%, higher than the national average of 59.5%: male literacy is 71%, and female literacy is 55%. In Uttar Goara, 12% of the population is under 6 years of age.

Infrastructure
As per the District Census Handbook 2011, Uttar Goara covered an area of 1.61 km2. It had 5 km roads. Amongst the medical facilities, the nearest nursing home was 1 km away and the nearest veterinary hospital was 1 km away. It had 3 primary schools. The nearest secondary and senior secondary schools were 1.5 km away at Nibhuji.

Education
Uttar Goara has one primary school.

References

Cities and towns in Purba Bardhaman district